Omonadus floralis, known generally as the narrow-necked grain beetle or predator beetle, is a species of antlike flower beetle in the family Anthicidae. It is found in the Caribbean, Central America, North America, Oceania, and South America.

References

Further reading

External links

 

Anthicidae
Articles created by Qbugbot
Beetles described in 1758
Taxa named by Carl Linnaeus